Sidney Brown was an English footballer who played as a goalkeeper for Port Vale, Gillingham, West Bromwich Albion, Congleton Town, and Dudley Town.

Career
Brown joined Port Vale in November 1923, making his debut in a 5–1 FA Cup qualifier defeat to Wrexham at the Racecourse Ground on 1 December. He went on to play eight Second Division games in the 1923–24 season, but remained as Tommy Lonsdale's understudy. New signing Tom Fern then took the number one jersey at The Old Recreation Ground, and Brown was limited to four games in the 1924–25 and 1925–26 campaigns, before he was released at the end of the 1926–27 season. He moved on to Gillingham, West Bromwich Albion, Congleton Town and Dudley Town.

Career statistics
Source:

References

Year of birth missing
Year of death missing
People from Brierley Hill
English footballers
Association football goalkeepers
Port Vale F.C. players
Gillingham F.C. players
West Bromwich Albion F.C. players
Congleton Town F.C. players
Dudley Town F.C. players
English Football League players